Sorex araneus grantii is a subspecies of the shrew Sorex araneus, found only on the Scottish island of Islay. It was previously considered a separate species, Sorex grantii. It is distinguished from mainland shrews by its very grey flanks and different dentition.

References

araneus granti
Endemic fauna of Scotland
Mammals of Europe
Islay
Endemic biota of the Scottish islands